Neonteichos was a fortified town on the coast of ancient Thrace, mentioned in the Periplus of Pseudo-Scylax and by Xenophon.

Its site is tentatively located near Servili in European Turkey.

References

Populated places in ancient Thrace
Former populated places in Turkey
History of Tekirdağ Province